Pontarddulais Comprehensive School is an 11–16 mixed comprehensive school situated in the town of Pontarddulais, Wales. It is  maintained by the Local Education Authority (LEA), the City and County of Swansea. It is mainly fed by primary schools in Pontarddulais, Pontlliw, Penllergaer, Llangyfelach and Pengelli.

Notable former pupils

Keira Bevan - Rugby Union (Bristol Bears Women, Wales)
Lukas Carey - Cricket (Glamorgan)
Aneurin Donald - Cricket (Glamorgan, Hampshire & England Under-19 captain) 
James Harris   - Cricket (Glamorgan, Middlesex & England Under-19)
Joe Rodon - Football (Tottenham Hotspur & Wales National Football Team) 
Aaron Shingler  - Rugby Union (Scarlets & Wales)
Steven Shingler - Rugby Union (Scarlets, Cardiff Blues & Wales Under-20)

References

External links
 

Educational institutions established in 1982
1982 establishments in Wales
Secondary schools in Swansea